Mommie Dearest is a 1978 memoir written by Christina Crawford.

Mommie Dearest, Mommy Dearest or Mummy Dearest may also refer to:

 Mommie Dearest (film), a 1981 film adaptation of the memoir
 "Mommie Dearest" (Scream Queens), a 2015 episode of the TV series Scream Queen
 "Mommie Dearest", a 2017 episode of the TV series Feud
 "Mommy Dearest" (Grimm), a 2014 episode of the TV series Grimm
 "Mommy Dearest", a 2007 episode of the TV series The Best Years
 Mommy, Dearest, alternative title of the 2005 South Korean film Bravo, My Life
 Mummy Dearest (film), a 2015 Nigerian film
 "Mummy Dearest", a 1989 episode of the animates series Garfield and Friends
 "Mummy Dearest", a 1996 episode of the TV series Hercules: The Legendary Journeys